The State Committee for Justice of the Republic of Bashkortostan is an agency of the government of Bashkortostan, headquartered in Platonov House.
It is the successor of the former Ministry of Justice of the Republic of Bashkortostan.

After the 2015 Chief of the State Committee has been Vladimir Spele which was being Minister of Justice of the Republic of Bashkortostan in 2001–2006.

References

External links
 Official Website in Russian

Politics of Bashkortostan